The Falkenstein lies southeast of the small town of Tambach-Dietharz in Schmalwasser bottom (Schmalwassergrund) and is the most important rock formation in the Thuringian Forest in central Germany. It consists of porphyry (rhyolite and andesite). Because of its situation on the side of a hill (the uphill side has a height of about ) it appears most striking when one stands immediately in front of it.

The area, which is near the Rennsteig climbing path, has a very montane climate due to its height. The Falkenstein was first climbed in 1852 by the Tambach glassmaker, Jacob Zimmermann. Since then it has become a rock climbing site with climbing routes of varying grades. At the foot of the Falkenstein there is a mountain rescue hut.

Sources 
 Zimmermann, W. et al. (1990). Thüringer Wald. Kleiner Naturführer. = Gothaer Museumsheft - Abhandlungen und Berichte des Museums der Natur Gotha, Lfd. No. 9, Gotha, ISSN 0138-1857

Rock formations of Thuringia
Gotha (district)
Climbing areas of Germany